Nelson Mauricio Ancheta Flores  (born 30 July 1963 in Chalchuapa) is a former Salvadoran professional football player and currently manager.

Playing career
Nelson Ancheta began his career playing at Universidad Católica de El Salvador during his youth. Afterwards he joined Once Lobos where he would play eleven years in two different spells (playing in between the Primera División and Segunda División). He would go on to play for Universidad Centroamericana José Simeón Cañas and Huracán; the latter would be where he would finish his playing career in 1997.

Coaching career

Fuerte Fronterizo
Ancheta's coaching career began in 1987, debuting with Fuerte Fronterizo in the Segunda División. 
However, he had to wait until 1994 to coach a first team squad, this time with Juventud Candelareña in the Tercera División.

Once Lobos
This was followed with coaching the club he had played in previously, Once Lobos, both the reserves and then later the main team (playing in the Segunda División at the time).

Isidro Menéndez
In 1999, he coached Isidro Menéndez, now known as Isidro Metapán. In 2000, he became the assistant coach of Agustín Castillo in FAS main team, and the coach of FAS reserve team. During these periods, FAS won five championships and Ancheta managed to coach FAS in 11 games.

Atlético Balboa
Afterward, he coached Atlético Balboa in 2006.

Once Municipal
Ancheta was offered the coaching job for Once Municipal, which led to his most successful tenure in his coaching career, winning his first and so far only domestic title with them (winning the Apertura 2006 title after defeating his old club FAS 3–1), while also winning the Copa Presidente 2006–2007 against Águila (1–0 victory).

Return to FAS
However, the difference with the club's president meant that he left his coaching position. He then returned to FAS to take over as head coach of the team. He took the club to two consecutive finals (Apertura 2007 and Clausura 2008); however, he lost on both occasions.

Nejapa FC
He left the club after a disagreement with the board of the club and joined low table team Nejapa FC in 2009. With smart recruitment and clever tactics he took Nejapa FC to their first and only semi-finals in the Clausura 2009. However, the club was destroyed 6–1 on aggregate by Isidro Metapán and he left the club following this loss.

He coached various clubs in the next couple of years, including Once Municipal, Alianza, Águila and Luis Ángel Firpo, with varying degrees of success.

Ciclón del Golfo
He then joined the newly formed club Ciclón del Golfo in 2012 and helped them win the Apertura 2012 de la Segunda División after a 2–1 aggregate victory over Turín FESA.

Dragón
He then took over the reins of Dragón and led them to the club's first final (Clausura 2014) in Clausura/Apertura format and almost helped Dragón win their first title in 70 years. However, the club lost against Isidro Metapán on penalties in that final. A pay dispute with the Dragón board of directors meant that he left the club, in May 2014. Ancheta was replaced by Roberto Gamarra.

Return to Luis Ángel Firpo
Ancheta joined Luis Ángel Firpo in 2014 in the quest to regain promotion back into the Primera División. However, in their first campaign, despite going 16 games undefeated in the regular season, they were knocked out in the quarter-finals by Marte Soyapango.

Deportivo Malacateco
Ancheta had his first coaching job abroad by coaching Deportivo Malacateco in Guatemala, however his time there was a poor one in the fourteen games he coached the team won two games, drew four and lost eleven. On 5 November 2015, he resigned as coach of Deportivo Malacateco.

Chalatenango
After passing through Guatemala, he joined Chalatenango. But surprisingly Ancheta resigned due to the dispute of two directives to gain control of the team.

Independiente FC
In 2016 Ancheta joined Independiente FC of the Segunda División.

Return to Dragón
In September 2016, he returned to Dragón, at a time when the team was going through an administrative, economic and sports crisis. Ancheta left the club in February 2017 due to poor results in the matches and was replaced by Víctor Coreas.

Chagüite
In 2018, he signed with Chagüite.

Jocoro
However, months later he would return to the Primera División with Jocoro, newly promoted team. With the team of Morazán Ancheta brings regular results, making Jocoro the revelation team of the Apertura 2018 tournament.

Sonsonate
On 11 December 2018, Ancheta signed as new coach of Sonsonate for the Clausura 2019, replacing Hugo Ovelar.

Honours

Playing

Club
 Once Lobos
 Primera División 
 Third Place: 1982, 1983

Manager

Club
Once Municipal
 Primera División
 Champions: Apertura 2006
Copa Presidente
 Champions: 2006-2007

C.D. FAS
 Primera División 
 Runners-up: Apertura 2007, Clausura 2008

Ciclón del Golfo
 Segunda División
  Champions: 2012 Apertura

Dragón
 Primera División 
 Runners-up: Clausura 2014

References

External links

1963 births
Living people
People from Santa Ana Department
Salvadoran football managers
C.D. FAS managers
C.D. Águila managers
C.D. Luis Ángel Firpo managers